Shahzad Khan (born 20 February 1981) is a Canadian cricketer. He plays as a batsman, but with the ability to bowl at a fast-medium pace. He made his debut in both first-class cricket and list A cricket for Canada against the Netherlands in the Dutch tour of Canada.

References

Canadian cricketers
Canada One Day International cricketers
1981 births
Living people
Shahzad
Shahzad
Shahzad
Canadian sportspeople of Pakistani descent